Sorsa's second cabinet was the 60th government of Finland. The majority cabinet was in office from 15 May 1977 to 26 May 1979. The prime minister was Kalevi Sorsa (sd.).
 
The second Sorsa cabinet started its term during a time of financial hardship. This required the cabinet to mend the situation by the use of stimulus projects. The second Sorsa cabinet started to make plans for decreasing the rate of inflation and strengthening national export. Though initially negative, Finland's balance of international payments turned positive toward the end of the cabinet’s term.

Sorsa
1977 establishments in Finland
1979 disestablishments in Finland
Cabinets established in 1977
Cabinets disestablished in 1979